Mirosław Michał Baka (born 15 December 1963 in Ostrowiec Świętokrzyski) is a Polish actor. 

One of his best-known roles is Jacek in A Short Film About Killing (1988) directed by Krzysztof Kieślowski. He also appeared in the comedy television series Bao-Bab, czyli zielono mi in 2003.

References

1963 births
Living people
People from Ostrowiec Świętokrzyski
Polish male film actors
Polish male stage actors